Olmo al Brembo is a comune (municipality) in the Province of Bergamo in the Italian region of Lombardy, located about  northeast of Milan and about  north of Bergamo.  

Olmo al Brembo borders the following municipalities: Averara, Cassiglio, Mezzoldo, Piazza Brembana, Piazzatorre, Piazzolo, Santa Brigida. Olmo al Brembo is an ancient village built along Strada Priula. About  from there is San Marco Pass, which links Valle Brembana and Valtellina

References